Jean Philippe Vogel (9 January 1871 in The Hague – 10 April 1958 in Oegstgeest), popularly known by his initials J. Ph. Vogel, was a Dutch Sanskritist and epigraphist who worked with the Archaeological Survey of India from 1901 to 1914 and later, as Professor in the University of Leiden.

In the ASI 
Vogel worked as Superintendent of the Punjab, Baluchistan and Ajmer based at Lahore from January 1901 to 1914. Between 1910 and 1911, he even deputised as Director General of ASI in the absence of John Marshall. As archaeologist, Vogel participated in excavations in Gandhara, the Punjab Hill States, Kusinagara and Mathura.

References

External links
 
 "Jean Philippe Vogel, The Forgotten Icon of Kashmir Archaeology " - article by Bhushan Parimoo, in The Kashmir Monitor, Aug 14, 2017.

1871 births
1958 deaths
Dutch Indologists
Dutch Sanskrit scholars
Academic staff of Leiden University
Writers from The Hague
University of Amsterdam alumni
Members of the Royal Netherlands Academy of Arts and Sciences
Members of the Académie des Inscriptions et Belles-Lettres
Companions of the Order of the Indian Empire
Knights of the Order of the Netherlands Lion